Deep image prior is a type of convolutional neural network used to enhance a given image with no prior training data other than the image itself.
A neural network is randomly initialized and used as prior to solve inverse problems such as noise reduction, super-resolution, and inpainting. Image statistics are captured by the structure of a convolutional image generator rather than by any previously learned capabilities.

Method

Background 
Inverse problems such as noise reduction, super-resolution, and inpainting can be formulated as the optimization task , where  is an image,  a corrupted representation of that image,  is a task-dependent data term, and R(x) is the regularizer. This forms an energy minimization problem.

Deep neural networks learn a generator/decoder  which maps a random code vector  to an image .

The image corruption method used to generate  is selected for the specific application.

Specifics 
In this approach, the  prior is replaced with the implicit prior captured by the neural network (where  for images that can be produced by a deep neural networks and  otherwise). This yields the equation for the minimizer  and the result of the optimization process .

The minimizer  (typically a gradient descent) starts from a randomly initialized parameters and descends into a local best result to yield the  restoration function.

Overfitting 

A parameter θ may be used to recover any image, including its noise. However, the network is reluctant to pick up noise because it contains high impedance while useful signal offers low impedance. This results in the θ parameter approaching a good-looking local optimum so long as the number of iterations in the optimization process remains low enough not to overfit data.

Applications

Denoising 

The principle of denoising is to recover an image  from a noisy observation , where . The distribution  is sometimes known (e.g.: profiling sensor and photon noise) and may optionally be incorporated into the model, though this process works well in blind denoising.

The quadratic energy function  is used as the data term, plugging it into the equation for  yields the optimization problem .

Super-resolution 

Super-resolution is used to generate a higher resolution version of image x. The data term is set to  where d(·) is a downsampling operator such as Lanczos that decimates the image by a factor t.

Inpainting 

Inpainting is used to reconstruct a missing area in an image . These missing pixels are defined as the binary mask .

Flash–no-flash reconstruction 

This approach may be extended to multiple images. A straightforward example mentioned by the author is the reconstruction of an image to obtain natural light and clarity from a flash–no-flash pair. Video reconstruction is possible but it requires optimizations to take into account the spatial differences.

Implementations 
 A reference implementation rewritten in Python 3.6 with the PyTorch 0.4.0 library was released by the author under the Apache 2.0 license: deep-image-prior 
 A TensorFlow-based implementation written in Python 2 and released under the CC-SA 3.0 license: deep-image-prior-tensorflow
 A Keras-based implementation written in Python 2 and released under the GPLv3: machine_learning_denoising

References 

 

Deep learning